Paul Anthony Reinmuth (27 March 1954 – 6 December 2018) was an Australian rules footballer who played for Hawthorn in the Victoria Football League (VFL).

Paul Reinmuth played his early football at Hawthorn District. He made just one appearance for Hawthorn in the VFL, a 47-point win over St Kilda at Princes Park in round nine of the 1974 season. The next stage of his career took place in the Northern Tasmanian Football Association and he won the Hec Smith Memorial Medal in 1981 while playing at East Launceston.

Son Tom Reinmuth now coaches the Longford Football club, in the Northern Tasmanian Football Association. Tom a backline player that played in the last South Launceston Football club TSL premiership 2013.

References

External links

1954 births
Hawthorn Football Club players
East Launceston Football Club players
Australian rules footballers from Victoria (Australia)
2018 deaths